The Valley Catholic is the official quarterly magazine of the Roman Catholic Diocese of San Jose in California. It is primarily written in English but includes sections in Spanish and Vietnamese. Its motto is "The Good News of the Diocese of San Jose".

History
The Valley Catholic was founded in 1982. It originally published as a newspaper 19 times a year, roughly biweekly. In 2021, after a 14-month hiatus due to the COVID-19 pandemic, it was relaunched as a magazine.

See also
 List of Catholic newspapers and magazines in the United States

References

External links
 

1982 establishments in California
Bilingual magazines
Catholic magazines published in the United States
Magazines established in 1982
Magazines published in the San Francisco Bay Area
Quarterly magazines published in the United States
Roman Catholic Diocese of San Jose in California
Spanish-language magazines
Vietnamese-language magazines